Peter of Aquila, O.F.M., (Scotellus) (d. 1361) was an Italian Friar Minor, theologian and bishop.

Peter was born at L'Aquila in the Abruzzo, Italy, towards the end of the 13th century.  In 1334 he figures as a Master of Theology and as Minister Provincial of his Order for Tuscany. In 1334 he was appointed confessor to Queen Joan I of Naples and shortly afterwards Inquisitor for Florence. His servants having been punished by public authority, the Inquisitor excommunicated the priors and placed the town under interdict.

On 12 February 1347, Peter was named Bishop of S. Angelo de Lombardi in Calabria, and, on 30 May 1348, was transferred to the Diocese of Trivento, where he died.

He was an able interpreter of John Duns Scotus, and was called Doctor sufficiens. His chief works are commentaries on the four books of Sentences, which being a compendium of the doctrine of Scotus were called Scotellum, whence the author's surname "Scotellus". The commentaries have passed through various editions, the first by Peter Drach, at Speier, 1480, and by Paolini (Genoa, 1907–09).

References
Eubel, Bullarium Franciscanum, VI (Rome, 1902), 192, 214
Analecta Franciscana, IV (Quaracchi, 1906), 339, 530
Luke Wadding, Annales Minorum, ad a. 1343, n. 35; ad a. 1346, nn, 4, 5 
Wadding, Scriptores Ord. Min. (Rome, 1806), 187
Sbaralea, Supplem. Ad Script. Ord. Min. (Rome, 1806), 583
Mazzuchelli, Gli scrittori d'Italia, II (Brescia, 1753), 902-3 
Cappalletti, Le chiese d'Italia, XX (Venice, 1866), 551.

External links
Petrus de Aquila (de Aquileia, Scotellus/doctor sufficiens, d. 1361) from FRANCISCAN AUTHORS, 13TH - 18TH CENTURY: A CATALOGUE IN PROGRESS, Bert Roest and Maarten van der Heijden
Peter of Aquila - Catholic Encyclopedia article

13th-century births
1361 deaths
Italian Friars Minor
Franciscan bishops
Franciscan theologians
14th-century Italian Roman Catholic bishops
14th-century Italian Roman Catholic theologians
Scholastic philosophers
Scotism
People from L'Aquila
Bishops in Calabria
Bishops in Molise